Pisa, also known as West Awyu and Asue Awyu, is an Awyu language of South Papua, Indonesia.

It may actually be three languages, depending on one's criteria for a 'language': 

West Awyu
Wildeman River Awyu (Pisà)
Asue River Awyu
Miaro River Awyu
Kewet River Awyu

References

Languages of western New Guinea
Awyu–Dumut languages